The 1999 BC Lions finished in first place in the West Division with a 13–5 record. They appeared in the West Final.

Offseason

CFL Draft

Preseason

Regular season

Season standings

Season schedule

Awards and records
 Paul Lacoste, Outstanding Rookie
 Jamie Taras, Tom Pate Memorial Award

1999 CFL All-Stars

Western Division All-Star Selections

Playoffs

West Final

References

BC Lions seasons
BC Lions
1999 in British Columbia